Quentin Howieson Gibson FRS (9 December 1918 – 16 March 2011) was a Scottish American physiologist, and professor at University of Sheffield, and Cornell University.

Education
Gibson earned a Doctor of Medicine degree in 1944 and a Ph.D. in 1946, from Queen's University Belfast.

Life
Gibson taught at the University of Sheffield from 1947. Whilst at the University of Sheffield Gibson met Audrey Jane Pinsent in 1951. They married, started a family, and eventually had four children. Jane Gibson continued working part-time whilst raising her family. In 1963 they emigrated to the United States, where she took up positions, first at the University of Pennsylvania. He succeeded (Sir) Hans Krebs as the Head of the Department of Biochemistry in 1955. In 1963 he left Sheffield to become a professor at the University of Pennsylvania. 
He was the Greater Philadelphia Professor at Cornell University, from 1965 to 1996.
In 1982, he became a U.S. citizen.

Research

Hemoglobin
Gibson started his career with studies of hemoglobin,
 and continued with much other work on heme proteins.

Medical and physiological work
In keeping with his medical qualifications, much of Gibson's early work
 had medical or physiological relevance.

Cooperativity
During the period when protein and enzyme cooperativity was at the center of biochemical interest Gibson studied it in the context of abnormal hemoglobins.

Rapid reactions
Gibson made major contributions to the development of methods for studying rapid reactions, and their application to hemoglobin.

Other proteins
Other work concerned enzymes such as "diaphorase", glucose oxidase, cytochrome oxidase and peroxidase.

Thermodynamics
Much of Gibson's work concerned questions of thermodynamics and equilibria, and in that context he participated in discussions about how to present thermodynamic data.

Awards and honours
Gibson was elected a Fellow of the Royal Society in 1969. He was also a member of the National Academy of Sciences, and an associate editor of the Journal of Biological Chemistry from 1975 to 1994.

References

External links

 J. Woodland Hastings and John S. Olson, "Quentin H. Gibson", Biographical Memoirs of the National Academy of Sciences (2014)

1918 births
2011 deaths
Alumni of Queen's University Belfast
Academics of the University of Sheffield
University of Pennsylvania faculty
Cornell University faculty
American physiologists
Scottish emigrants to the United States
Members of the United States National Academy of Sciences
Fellows of the Royal Society